Pilgrim Radio is a network of radio stations broadcasting a Christian Radio format. Pilgrim Radio's programming includes interviews with Christian leaders, discussion of current events/issues, news, a book-reading program, and Biblically based teaching messages, along with Christian Contemporary music. Pilgrim Radio is listener-supported and commercial-free.

The network is owned and operated by Western Inspirational Broadcasters, Inc., a 501(c)3 tax-exempt non-profit organization.

Stations
In addition to streaming its programming at pilgrimradio.com, the signal is broadcast over-the-air on KNIS in Carson City, Nevada, KNVQ in Elko, Nevada, KDOX in Big Pine, California, KCSP-FM in Casper, Wyoming, KDNR in Cheyenne, Wyoming, KTME in Rock Springs / Green River, Wyoming, KPMD in Evanston, Wyoming, KMJB in Lander / Riverton, Wyoming, and KLMT in Billings, Montana. Its signal is also extended by a network of 28 FM translators in Nevada, California, and Wyoming.

Full-powered stations

Notes:

Translators

References

External links
Pilgrim Radio's website 
Pilgrim Radio's webcast

Radio broadcasting companies of the United States
Christian mass media companies
Christian radio stations in the United States
Radio stations established in 1970
1970 establishments in the United States